McMakin's Tavern, also known as the Morgan-Stewart House, is a historic stagecoach stop and plantation home located near Lyman, Spartanburg County, South Carolina. It was built about 1790, and is a two-story, clapboard single house with gable end chimneys. It features a one-story, full width veranda supported by square columns. The interior features elaborately carved woodwork in the Adam style. The house operated as a stagecoach stop in the early-19th century.

It was listed on the National Register of Historic Places in 1974.

References

Houses on the National Register of Historic Places in South Carolina
Houses completed in 1790
Houses in Spartanburg County, South Carolina
National Register of Historic Places in Spartanburg County, South Carolina